Kundali is an Indian television soap opera that initially aired on Metro Gold in 2000. After the channel closed, the series was taken over by STAR Plus, and aired from the beginning. The series is produced by Balaji Telefilms. It remade in Kannada as Kavyanjali which aired on Udaya TV and dubbed in Telugu as Kavyanjali which aired on Gemini TV, Tamil as Kavyanjali which aired on Star Vijay , Malayalam as Kavyanjali which aired on Surya TV. All regional languages series is produced by Balaji Telefilms.

Plot
The story centers on two sisters, Aarti and Vidhi, whose lives are governed by their parents' decision to marry them only to men having horoscopes that perfectly match theirs. Aarti (Nivedita Bhattacharya) is the mature and responsible elder sister while Vidhi (Prachi Shah) is the impulsive, slightly childish but loving younger one. As luck would have it, the sisters find suitable matches in Viraj (Anupam Bhattacharya) and Abhishek (Yash Tonk), two brothers who are devoted to each other. But there is a twist: because of their parents' insistence on matching horoscopes, Aarti, the elder sister, is married to Abhishek, the younger brother; while the younger sister Vidhi marries the elder brother Viraj. This leads to a few awkward situations, but the couples are basically quite happy. However, a series of trying circumstances overcomes the lives of the four, threatening to tear their most valuable relationships apart. How they overcome these challenges, and how their mutual love prevails in the end, forms the story of Kundali.

Cast
 Vipul Katre as Sunita Mesram
 Nivedita Bhattacharya as Aarti Abhishek Agarwal
 Prachi Shah as Vidhi Viraj Agarwal
 Anupam Bhattacharya as Viraj Agarwal
 Yash Tonk as Abhishek Agarwal
 Manorama as Dai Maa, the nanny
 Prabha Sinha as Nirmala Agarwal
 Sai Ballal as Mr. Agarwal
 Nandita Thakur as Aarti and Vidhi's mother
 Uday Tikekar as Aarti and Vidhi's father
 Prashant Bhatt as Aarti and Vidhi's brother

References

External links

 Kundali Official Site on STAR Plus

Balaji Telefilms television series
Metro Gold original programming
Indian television soap operas
Indian drama television series
2000 Indian television series debuts
2001 Indian television series endings